Art is the range of human activity of imaginative talent, and its output.

Art or arts may refer to:

Arts-related 
 The arts, the general types of artistic expression
 Liberal arts, broad categories of study
 Fine art, an art form developed primarily for aesthetics and/or concept rather than utility
 Fan art, artwork of a given topic of interest created by its enthusiasts

Music
 Art (band), an English rock group, renamed from The V.I.P.'s
 Art (album), by jazz trumpeter Art Farmer
 ...art, an album by Regurgitator
 "Art", a song by Taproot from Welcome

Places 
 Art, Indiana, a small town in the United States
 Art, Texas, an unincorporated community in the United States
 Art Island, an island of New Caledonia

People 
 Art (given name)
 Tenille Arts (born 1994), Canadian country music singer

Other uses 
 Art (skill), a branch of learned knowledge
 art, archaic form of the English verb be
 Art (play), by Yasmina Reza
 Art Co., Ltd, a Japanese video game developer
 Arts and Humanities Focus Program, a Nebraska school commonly referred to as "Arts"
 Android Runtime (ART), the virtual machine in Google's Android operating system
 Assisted reproductive technology, used to achieve pregnancy in different procedures
 XIX Art, a Swiss paraglider design

See also 

 ART (disambiguation) 
 ARTS (disambiguation)